Mónica Martínez (born 16 April 1968), better known as Mona Martínez, is a film and theatre actress from Andalusia, Spain.

Biography 
Martínez started her career as a ballet dancer at the age of 10. 

In 2002, she made her acting debut with the series Padre coraje,  directed by Benito Zambrano. There was no looking back since then. She starred in movies and television shows like Al sur de Granada, Ana de día, El Reino, Taxi a Gibraltar, and Adiós, for which she was nominated for a Goya Award for Best Supporting Actress. Her television series includes Vis a Vis, Anclados, Vota a Juan and Paquita Salas.

Filmography

Films

Short films

Television series

Theatre works

Awards and nominations

References 

Actresses from Andalusia
Spanish film actresses
Spanish television actresses
Spanish theatre directors
1968 births
Living people